Alan Brinkley (June 2, 1949 – June 16, 2019) was an American political historian who taught for over 20 years at Columbia University. He was the Allan Nevins Professor of History until his death. From 2003 to 2009, he was University Provost.

Early life
Brinkley was born in Washington, D.C., the son of Ann (Fischer) and David Brinkley, a long-time television newscaster at NBC and ABC. Alan was a brother of Joel Brinkley. Brinkley graduated with an A.B. from the Woodrow Wilson School of Public and International Affairs at Princeton University in 1971. He had completed a 218-page senior thesis titled "The Gospel of Discontent: Huey Long in National Politics 1932-1935." His advisor was Professor Nancy Weiss Malkiel. He received his Ph.D. in history from Harvard University in 1979. His doctoral dissertation titled "The Long and Coughlin movements: dissident voices in the Great Depression" was directed by Frank Freidel, an authority on Franklin D. Roosevelt.

Career
Brinkley's scholarship has focused mainly on the period of the Great Depression and World War II. Among his books are Voices of Protest: Huey Long, Father Coughlin, and the Great Depression (1983), which won the National Book Award. He argued that the two demagogues were not proto-fascists, but represented genuine popular anxieties rooted in the American experience of the Great Depression. He wrote The End of Reform: New Deal Liberalism in Recession and War (1995); Liberalism and its Discontents (1998); and The Publisher: Henry Luce and His American Century (2010), which won the Ambassador Book Prize and the Sperber Prize, as well as being a Pulitzer Prize finalist. He is the author of two short biographies:  Franklin D. Roosevelt (2009) and John F. Kennedy (2012).

His essay "The Problem of American Conservatism" was published in the American Historical Review in 1994 and sparked scholarly interest in a neglected topic.

He was one of three American historians to have been both Harmsworth Professor of American History at Oxford (1998-1999) and Pitt Professor of American History at Cambridge (2011-2012). He was an honorary fellow of the Rothermere American Institute at the University of Oxford. He received the Jerome Levenson Teaching Prize in 1982 at Harvard University, where Brinkley taught for seven years; and the Great Teacher Award at Columbia in 2003.

He became the provost of Columbia on July 1, 2003.

He was the chair of the board of the Century Foundation in New York, and he was the chairman of the National Humanities Center in North Carolina. He was also a trustee of Oxford University Press from 2009 to 2012, and a trustee of the Dalton School.

In 2018, Columbia University Press published Alan Brinkley: A Life in History, edited by David Greenberg, Moshik Temkin, and Mason B. Williams. The book includes essays about Brinkley's scholarship and career by many of his doctoral advisees as well as personal essays by friends and colleagues of his including A. Scott Berg, Frank Rich, and Nicholas Lemann.

Textbooks
Brinkley was the senior author of two best-selling, frequently updated American history textbooks, American History: A Survey and The Unfinished Nation. They are widely used in universities and in AP United States History high school classes. He also wrote the commonly-used AP US History textbook American History: Connecting With The Past.

Brinkley assumed sole responsibility for the ninth edition of the American History: A Survey textbook from historians Richard N. Current, Frank Freidel, and T. Harry Williams. He had joined the team to help with the 1979 revisions.

Historian Emil Pocock, evaluating the ninth edition of 1995, said it is:
Typical of the mass market textbook....Brinkley offers a traditional narrative of American history. Built around a core of political and economic events, this attractive colored text contains a good selection of illustrations, maps, charts, and other graphics, as well as other features designed to make it stand out among the competition....This latest edition has integrated additional material on immigrants, Native Americans, African-Americans, and women into the political narrative.

Personal details
He lived in Manhattan, New York with his wife, Evangeline Morphos, and his daughter, Elly.

On June 16, 2019, Brinkley died at his home in Manhattan from complications of frontotemporal dementia.

Works
 America in the Twentieth Century (1960), co-authored with Frank Freidel; 5th ed. published in 1982 – used in college 20th century U.S. history classes.
 American History: A Survey, originally by Richard N. Current, T. Harry Williams, and Frank Freidel (1961), by Brinkley in recent editions, reaching the 11th ed. in 1995, 13th ed. in 2009, and 15th ed. in 2015 — used especially for AP U.S. History and International Baccalaureate History courses.
 1982 Voices of Protest: Huey Long, Father Coughlin, and the Great Depression — winner of the National Book Award
 1992 The Unfinished Nation: A Concise History of the American People (2 vols.). Later eds. are co-written by Harvey H. Jackson and Bradley Robert Rice.
 1995 The End of Reform: New Deal Liberalism in Recession and War
 1997 New Federalist Papers: Essays in Defense of the Constitution with Nelson W. Polsby and Kathleen M. Sullivan
 1998 Liberalism and Its Discontents
 1999 Culture and Politics in the Great Depression
 2009 Franklin Delano Roosevelt
 2010 The Publisher: Henry Luce and His American Century
 2012 John F. Kennedy: The American Presidents Series: The 35th President, 1961-1963

Awards
 1983 National Book Award for Voices of Protest
 1987 Joseph R. Levenson Memorial Teaching Prize, Harvard University
 2003 Great Teacher Award, Columbia University
 2006-2007 Scholarly Journal Award by Kathy Walh-Henshaw at St. Mary's Lancaster

Notes

References

Further reading
 Brinkley, Alan. “The Challenges and Rewards of Textbook Writing: An Interview with Alan Brinkley.” Journal of American History 91#4 (2005): 1391–97 online.

 Greenberg, David, et al. eds. Alan Brinkley: A Life in History (2019); essays on Brinkley's career. excerpt  https://doi.org/10.7312/gree18724

 Greenberg, David. “After Reform: The Odyssey of American Liberalism in Liberalism and its Discontents.” in Alan Brinkley: A Life in History, edited by David Greenberg et al., (2019), pp. 39–52, online.

External links
 A Time to Remember, How Henry Luce Founded a Magazine Empire That Became His Bully Pulpit, The Wall Street Journal, 17 April 2010
 
  with Alan Brinkley  by Stephen McKiernan, Binghamton University Libraries Center for the Study of the 1960s, August 13, 1997 

1949 births
2019 deaths
20th-century American historians
20th-century American male writers
Columbia University faculty
Harold Vyvyan Harmsworth Professors of American History
Harvard Graduate School of Arts and Sciences alumni
Historians of the United States
National Book Award winners
Princeton School of Public and International Affairs alumni
The New York Review of Books people
Writers from Washington, D.C.
The Century Foundation
Deaths from dementia in New York (state)
Deaths from frontotemporal dementia
American male non-fiction writers